Moose Mountain refers to:

 Moose Mountain (Alaska), USA
 Moose Mountain (Minnesota), USA
 Moose Mountain (New Hampshire), USA
 Moose Mountain (Benson, New York), an elevation located in Hamilton County, New York
 Moose Mountain (Hamilton County, New York), an elevation
 Moose Mountain (Wells, New York), an elevation in Hamilton County, New York
 Moose Mountain (Wyoming), Teton Range, Wyoming, USA

 Moose Mountain (Alberta), Canada
 Moose Mountain (electoral district), a former federal electoral district in Saskatchewan, Canada
 Moose Mountain Provincial Park in Saskatchewan, Canada
 Rural Municipality of Moose Mountain No. 63, Saskatchewan, Canada
 Moose Mountain Upland, a plateau in southern Saskatchewan
 Moose Mountain Creek, a river in Saskatchewan
 Moose Mountain Lake, a lake in Saskatchewan